2014 AA was a small Apollo near-Earth asteroid roughly 2–4 meters in diameter that struck Earth on 2 January 2014. It was discovered on 1 January 2014 by Richard Kowalski at the Mount Lemmon Survey at an apparent magnitude of 19 using a  reflecting telescope at Mount Lemmon Observatory. 2014 AA was only observed over a short observation arc of about 70 minutes, and entered Earth's atmosphere about 21 hours after discovery. Nonetheless, it remains one of only a few asteroids observed before impact (see Asteroid impact prediction).

Entry

Using a poorly determined orbit, the JPL Small-Body Database listed a 3-sigma solution with impact occurring around 2 January 2014 02:33 UT ± 1 hour and 5 minutes. The Minor Planet Center listed impact as occurring around 2 January 2014 05:00 UT ± 10 hours. Independent calculations by Bill Gray, the Minor Planet Center and Steve Chesley at the Jet Propulsion Laboratory verified that impact was virtually certain. It entered the atmosphere going about 11.7 km/s with respect to Earth.

Calculations by Chesley suggest the impactor fell somewhere on an arc extending from Central America to East Africa, with a best-fit location just off the coast of West Africa. Calculations by Pasquale Tricarico using the nominal orbit show that 2014 AA entered Earth's shadow cone approximately 40 minutes before entering the atmosphere.

Infrasound was detected by three stations of the Comprehensive Nuclear-Test-Ban Treaty Organization. Peter Brown and Petrus Jenniskens located weak signals from infrasound stations in Bolivia, Brazil and Bermuda. 2014 AA entered Earth's atmosphere around 03:06 ± 5 min UT, 3,000 km from Caracas, Venezuela, far from any landmass. No ships or planes reported witnessing the event. A recalculation of the impact parameters of this meteor based on infrasound recordings puts it in the Atlantic Ocean about 1900 km (1030 nautical miles) east of Port of Spain in Trinidad, at a longitude of impact of nearly 44º west and a latitude of 11º north, the impact time being 2456659.618 JD UTC.

Other discoveries 
Kowalski previously discovered , the first asteroid discovered before Earth's impact, using the same telescope in October 2008. There are about a billion near-Earth objects in the size range of 2014 AA, and impacts of comparably-sized objects occur several times each year.

Several years later, 2018 LA was also discovered by the Mount Lemmon Survey, and ended up impacting Earth in southern Botswana in June 2018.

See also
 Asteroid impact prediction
 
 WT1190F
 2018 LA
 2019 MO

References

External links 
 The atmospheric impact trajectory of asteroid 2014 AA arXiv 13 January 2016
 Two maps of the possible impact region (Yahoo groups / Project Pluto)
 2014 AA – New Year’s Earth impactor (Carl W. Hergenrother)
  
 

Minor planet object articles (unnumbered)
Discoveries by Richard Kowalski
January 2014 events
Predicted impact events
20140102
20140101
2014 in space